Yaseen is an Arabic-based name and a variant of Yasin, Yassin, Yassine and Yacine. It is an Arabic-based name used frequently in the Arab World and in Muslim countries;) is a surname and unisex given name of Arabic origin. The name comes from a chapter (surah) of the Quran called Ya-Sin. It is an epithet of the prophet Muhammad.

It may refer to:

Notable persons

Given name
Yaseen Anwar (born 1951), Pakistani-American banker, Governor of the State Bank of Pakistan 
Yaseen Al-Bakhit (born 1989), Jordanian footballer
Yaseen Bhatkal, or Yasin Bhatkal, full name Mohammed Ahmed Siddibappa, named by Indian investigative agencies, was the founder leader of the proscribed terrorist organisation Indian Mujahideen
Yaseen Khan Khalil, Pakistani politician, Member of the Provincial Assembly of Khyber Pakhtunkhwa
Yaseen Malik or Yasin Malik (born 1966), Kashmiri separatist leader and former militant who advocates the separation of Kashmir from both India and Pakistan 
Yaseen janjua (born 1988), journalist from Jammu and kashmir India
Yaseen Akhtar Misbahi, Sunni Sufi Islamic scholar associated with the Ahle Sunnat Barelvi organisation Raza Academy.
Yaseen al-Sheyadi (born 1994), Omani footballer
Yaseen Valli (born 1995), South African cricketer
Yaseen Vallie (born 1989), South African cricketer

Middle name
Rosa Yaseen Hassan, Syrian novelist and writer
Mohammed Yaseen Mohammed (born 1963), Iraqi weightlifter
Taha Yasin Ramadan (1938–2007), Iraqi Kurd politician, who served as one of the three Vice Presidents of Iraq

Surname
Abdulla Yaseen (born 1998), Bahraini handball player 
Ahmed Yaseen or Yassin (1937–2004)m Palestinian imam and politician and founder of Hamas
Anas Bani Yaseen (born 1988), Jordanian footballer 
Asaad Ali Yaseen (born 1953), Iraqi politician, businessman and diplomat
Bashar Bani Yaseen (born 1977), Jordanian footballer
Khalid Kamal Yaseen (born 1982), Bahraini long-distance runner
Moataz Yaseen (born 1982), Jordanian footballer
Mohammed Dawood Yaseen (born 2000), Iraqi footballer 
Muhammad Yaseen, Canadian politician, elected member of the Alberta Legislature
Taha Hussein Yaseen (born 1998), Iraqi sprinter specialising in the 400 metres
Mohd Yaseen Khan (Yaseen Janjua) (born 1988), journalist from Jammu and kashmir India

References

Arabic-language surnames
Arabic masculine given names